Klemen Pretnar (born August 31, 1986) is a Slovenian professional ice hockey defenceman who is currently a free agent. He previously played for HC Košice of the Slovak Extraliga.

In 2012, Pretner signed with EC VSV of the Austrian Hockey League. On April 15, 2015, Pretnar signed a one-year contract with fellow Austrian club, the Vienna Capitals.

He participated at the 2011 IIHF World Championship as a member of the Slovenia men's national ice hockey team.

Career statistics

Regular season and playoffs

International

References

External links

1986 births
HC '05 Banská Bystrica players
EC VSV players
HK Acroni Jesenice players
HC Košice players
Ice hockey players at the 2014 Winter Olympics
Living people
Olympic ice hockey players of Slovenia
People from Bled
Slovenian ice hockey defencemen
Vienna Capitals players
Yunost Minsk players
Slovenian expatriate ice hockey people
Slovenian expatriate sportspeople in Slovakia
Slovenian expatriate sportspeople in Austria
Slovenian expatriate sportspeople in Poland
Slovenian expatriate sportspeople in Belarus
Slovenian expatriate sportspeople in France
Slovenian expatriate sportspeople in Germany
Expatriate ice hockey players in Slovakia
Expatriate ice hockey players in Austria
Expatriate ice hockey players in Poland
Expatriate ice hockey players in Belarus
Expatriate ice hockey players in France
Expatriate ice hockey players in Germany
Starbulls Rosenheim players
TH Unia Oświęcim players
Gothiques d'Amiens players